Reverend  Gloster Stuart Udy OAM MBE (21 May 1918 – 4 May 2003) was an Australian Uniting Church minister and author.

Early life and education
Udy was the eldest son of Joseph George Stuart Udy (1885–1959) a Cornish Methodist minister and was one of three brothers who became ministers of religion. James Udy and Richard Udy were his younger brothers.  Udy attended Newington College (1933), North Sydney Boys High School and Maitland High School. He studied Arts at the University of Sydney graduating in 1939.

War service
Udy served during the Second World War as a sergeant and then captain and chaplain to the 2/23 Infantry Battalion. He was at the battle for Tarakan.

Christian mission
In 1951 he took up a posting as Minister of the Leigh Memorial Church at Parramatta. Later he founded The Upper Room in Australia, which is a group dedicated to helping people grow in relationship with God through regular spiritual practice. Udy was a Director of Lifeline and during his career served on the staff of the General Board of the Methodist Department of Evangelism in Nashville. After his retirement in 1988 he promoted the restoration of the Castlereagh Methodist Church which is the site of the first Methodist chapel in Australia. He is buried in the grounds.

Publications
Udy published seven books of history, religion and biography.

Honours
 1980 – Member of the Order of the British Empire (Civil) for service to the community
 2003 – Medal of the Order of Australia (Civil) for service to the community, particularly through Lifeline and the Parramatta Regional Methodist Mission – 2003
 2006 – Gloster Udy Memorial Hall at the Castlereagh Academy opened by Her Excellency Professor The Honourable Marie Bashir

References

1918 births
2003 deaths
Australian Members of the Order of the British Empire
Australian Methodist ministers
People educated at North Sydney Boys High School
People educated at Newington College
Recipients of the Medal of the Order of Australia
World War II chaplains
Australian chaplains
Uniting Church in Australia ministers